The 1995–96 NBA season was the Warriors' 50th season in the National Basketball Association, and 34th in the San Francisco Bay Area. The Warriors won the Draft Lottery, and selected Joe Smith from the University of Maryland with the first overall pick in the 1995 NBA draft. During the off-season, the team acquired B. J. Armstrong from the expansion Toronto Raptors, and signed free agents Jerome Kersey, and Jon Barry. With Armstrong and Kersey both in the lineup at point guard and small forward respectively, Tim Hardaway and Chris Mullin both played off the bench for most of the season. At midseason, Hardaway was traded along with Chris Gatling to the Miami Heat in exchange for Kevin Willis and Bimbo Coles. 

Under new head coach Rick Adelman, the Warriors held a 21–26 record at the All-Star break, and were in playoff connection with a 26–28 record as of February 24, but then lost 18 of their final 28 games. The team posted a 10–win improvement, finishing sixth in the Pacific Division with a 36–46 record, missing the playoffs by three games.

Latrell Sprewell led the team with 18.9 points and 1.6 steals per game, while Smith averaged 15.3 points, 8.7 rebounds and 1.6 blocks per game, and was selected to the NBA All-Rookie First Team, and finished in third place in Rookie of the Year voting. In addition, Mullin provided the team with 13.3 points and 1.4 steals per game, but only played 55 games due to a finger injury, while Armstrong contributed 12.3 points and 4.9 assists per game, Rony Seikaly provided with 12.1 points and 7.8 rebounds per game, and Kersey contributed 6.7 points, 4.8 rebounds and 1.2 steals per game.

Following the season, Willis signed as a free agent with the Houston Rockets, while Kersey signed with the Los Angeles Lakers, and Barry signed with the Atlanta Hawks.

Offseason

Draft picks

Roster

Regular season

Season standings

z - clinched division title
y - clinched division title
x - clinched playoff spot

Record vs. opponents

Game log

Player statistics

Season

Awards and records

Transactions

Trades

Free agents

Player Transactions Citation:

References

See also
 1995-96 NBA season

Golden State Warriors seasons
Golden
Golden
Golden State